The Press Banner is a local newspaper serving Scotts Valley and San Lorenzo Valley, California in Santa Cruz County. It is published once per week on Fridays.

It is operated by the Weeklys newspaper group, which also publishes the countywide free weekly Good Times, the monthly Aptos Life and Watsonville-based The Pajaronian.

History
The Press Banner was first published on December 2, 1960, as the Valley Press. In 1974, the owners of the Valley Press created and published the Scotts Valley Banner, which made its debut on February 27, 1974.

The publications were purchased in 2005 by Tank Town Media, which is owned by Will Fleet and Ralph Alldredge. The two papers merged to become the Press Banner. The first issue of the Press Banner was published on April 26, 2006.

The Press Banner was sold on October 1, 2020, to the publisher of Good Times in neighboring Santa Cruz, winner of the California Journalism Awards’ 2020 General Excellence award.

References

1960 establishments in California
Weekly newspapers published in California
Newspapers established in 1960
Mass media in Santa Cruz County, California